Central Park West (also known as CPW) is an American prime time television soap opera that ran from September 1995 to June 1996 on CBS. The series was created and executive produced by Darren Star. As the title suggests, CPW was set in New York, in the affluent Central Park West area of Manhattan. Mariel Hemingway, Mädchen Amick, and Kylie Travis portrayed three of the central characters on the show.

The program represented CBS's attempt to reestablish itself after a disastrous 1994-95 television season where the network lost a heavy amount of established affiliates due to affiliation switches related to Fox acquiring NFC football rights, and an attempt by the network to attract younger viewers. It was the network's most-promoted new show in many years with a promotional campaign exclusively produced to appeal to younger viewers, and attempted to recapture the network's past nighttime soap glory from the years of Dallas and Knots Landing. Australian singer and actress Kylie Minogue was offered a lead role, but declined.

The series was not successful and was removed from CBS' schedule in November 1995, returning some months later with new additions made to the cast (Hemingway left by this point, and Raquel Welch was brought in). The retooling was not enough to save the show, which was canceled in June 1996. The failure of the series returned the network quickly back to their traditional broadcasting focus and repairing relations between both the network's new affiliates and their older stations which were frustrated by the network's moves in programming rights and programming within the Laurence Tisch era, which would end shortly thereafter with Westinghouse's purchase of CBS, Inc. in 1995 (approval of CPW to be placed on the network's schedule came well before Westinghouse's purchase).

Synopsis
Central Park West premiered on September 13, 1995, and aired Wednesdays from 9:00 - 10:00 p.m. With a cast headlined by Mariel Hemingway, Central Park West centered around the glamorous and exciting life of the staff of trendy magazine Communique, owned by Allen Rush (Ron Leibman), "the Darth Vader of publishing". Mariel Hemingway played the role of Stephanie Wells, the newly appointed editor-in-chief of Communique. Central to the plot is the rivalry between Stephanie and Allen's stepdaughter Carrie Fairchild (Mädchen Amick), a scheming young woman who does her best to seduce Stephanie's writer husband Mark Merrill (Tom Verica). The series followed several other ambitious New Yorkers, as well as the evil and deceitful Australian bombshell Rachel Dennis (Kylie Travis), the new fashion editor at Communique.

Reception
Central Park West was initially geared towards Generation X viewers and was heavily promoted by CBS. The series failed to draw in viewers and was put on hiatus in November 1995. Central Park West was then revamped in an effort to attract older viewers. Mariel Hemingway's character was written out of the series, and Gerald McRaney, Noelle Beck and Raquel Welch joined the cast. Retitled CPW, the revamped version, which consisted of eight episodes, began airing June 1996, Wednesdays and Fridays from 10:00 - 11:00 p.m. The changes were unsuccessful as CBS canceled the series on June 28, 1996.

Cast

Main
 Mädchen Amick as Carrie Fairchild
 John Barrowman as Peter Fairchild
 Melissa Errico as Alex Bartoli
 Lauren Hutton as Linda Fairchild-Rush
 Justin Lazard as Gil Chase
 Michael Michele as Nikki Sheridan
 Tom Verica as Mark Merrill
 Kylie Travis as Rachel Dennis
 Mariel Hemingway as Stephanie Wells (season 1)
 Noelle Beck as Jordan Tate (season 2)
 Raquel Welch as Dianna Brock (season 2)
 Gerald McRaney as Adam Brock (season 2)

Recurring
 Ron Leibman as Allen Rush
 Michael Reilly Burke as Tyler Brock (season 2)

Episodes

Season 1 (1995)

Season 2 (1996)

Nielsen ratings
Central Park West debuted on Wednesday, September 13, 1995, ranking 61st for the week with 9.7 million viewers and a rating/share of 7.5/12.

Awards and nominations

Notes

References

External links
 
 

1990s American drama television series
1995 American television series debuts
1996 American television series endings
American television soap operas
American primetime television soap operas
Central Park
English-language television shows
Serial drama television series
CBS original programming
Television series by CBS Studios
Television shows set in New York City
Television series created by Darren Star